Duzyurt is a town in the central district (Trabzon) of Trabzon Province, Turkey. The population of Duzyurt is 1673.

Sport
The Trabzon Düzyurtspor is the most important sports club of the town.

The team currently plays in the TFF Second League.

Trabzon Climate 
Trabzon has a climate typical of the Black Sea region with plentiful precipitation. Under the Köppen climate classification, it has a humid subtropical climate (Köppen: Cfa).

Precipitation is heaviest in autumn and winter, with a marked reduction in the summer months. Snowfall is quite common between the months of December and March, snowing for a week or two, and it can be heavy once it snows.

References

Populated places in Trabzon Province
Towns in Turkey
Ortahisar